Barry R. Finegold (March 3, 1971 in Norwood, Massachusetts) currently serves as a Democratic member of the Massachusetts Senate representing the Second Essex and Middlesex district since 2019. He previously served from January 2011 to January 2015. He is a former state representative of the 17th Essex district in Massachusetts.  In January 2014, he announced that he would be a candidate for the Democratic nomination for Treasurer and Receiver-General of the Commonwealth of Massachusetts. On September 9, 2014, Finegold lost in the Democratic primary to Deb Goldberg, who was elected Treasurer in November 2014.

Biography
Barry Finegold was raised in Andover and Tewksbury with his two sisters. Both of his parents taught in local school systems for 33 years, his mother in the Andover Public Schools, and his father at Northern Essex Community College in Haverhill. Finegold attended both Andover and Tewksbury public schools. He then attended Franklin and Marshall College in Pennsylvania, graduating with a major in government with a business concentration. He went on to graduate from the Massachusetts School of Law in Andover and was admitted to the Massachusetts Bar in 1998. He is a partner with the law firm of Dalton & Finegold, LLP, which specializes in real estate, estate planning, and corporate law. Finegold also holds a Masters in Public Administration from the John F. Kennedy School of Government at Harvard University. He and his wife, Amy, live with their three children Ava, Ella and Max, and their bulldog Otis in Andover.

Public service
Finegold was elected to the Andover Board of Selectmen at age 24. A year later, in 1996, he won election to the Massachusetts House of Representatives as a Democrat. He held this position for 11 years, representing the 17th Essex District, consisting of Andover, Tewksbury and Lawrence. In 2010, he won election to the Massachusetts Senate representing the Second Essex and Middlesex District consisting of Andover, Dracut, Lawrence and Tewksbury. In 2012, he was re-elected to the Senate with 65% of the vote. In 2018, Senator Finegold won the seat with 63% of the vote.

During his time on Beacon Hill, Finegold has proposed and enacted numerous pieces of legislation on critical issues, such as:

The "Massachusetts Renewable Energy Road Map," a package of policy ideas designed to invigorate the Massachusetts economy and protect the environment with research-and-development grants and tax incentives for Massachusetts companies developing fuel-cell technology.  The legislation also creates a $1,500 state tax credit for consumers who purchase hybrid vehicles.
The Safe Havens Act allows parents who are unable to care for their newborn to drop the infant off at a marked fire station, police station or emergency room without fear of prosecution.  Baby Safe Haven has expanded its services to a hot-line that advises expecting parents on their options.  The law has saved 15 babies to date in the Commonwealth.
In 2000, Finegold authored the Holocaust Restitution Bill, which ensured that the 3,500 Massachusetts holocaust survivors did not have to pay taxes or incur penalties on recovered assets from the Swiss Government.
In the 2007 budget cycle, Finegold brought funding to keep Delamano, a Spanish-speaking battered women’s hotline, up and running.
Finegold helped create the Massachusetts Hydrogen Coalition and is working to expand hydrogen, fuel cell, and related industries in the Commonwealth.
In Finegold's partnership with police chief John Romero, crime rates have continued to decrease in the city of Lawrence.
Finegold brought home funding to ensure that Andover Youth Services can continue in its mission to foster education and personal growth in our youth.
With Finegold’s help, the Lawrence school system has benefited from two new buildings, three new schools, and increased funding.
Finegold worked with Dracut residents to secure funding from the Massachusetts School Building Authority for the new Dracut High School. With his efforts, the town received $37 million from the state for the renovation and addition project.
He was also an early supporter of the new Tewksbury High School project and pushed for the construction of a new, energy efficient and technologically advanced facility, securing funding from the Massachusetts School Building Authority, which funded 60 percent of the project.
As the Senate Chair of the Election Laws Committee, Finegold was the chief architect of the 2014 election law reform bill, which brought early voting to Massachusetts, as well as online voter registration, post election audits, and preregistration of 16- and 17-year-olds. 

Since returning to office in January 2019, Senator Finegold has prioritized funding for public education and mental health resources, continued to push for election law reform, and advocated for school safety. In January, Finegold filed the "SAVE Students Act," takes a three-pronged approach to school safety: It would require school districts to establish a threat-assessment training and response program, create an anonymous reporting system run by the state Department of Education, and provide all middle school and high school students with evidence-based education on how to spot warning signs for violence and suicide .

In July 2019, he introduced "Conrad's Law," named after Conrad Roy, who died by suicide in July 2014 after being coerced by his girlfriend, Michelle Carter. The bill, filed with Representative Natalie Higgins, was written in collaboration with Northeastern University School of Law Professor Daniel Medwed and is supported by Conrad's parents. It would allow prosecutors to charge defendants who encourage, coerce, or manipulate another person into committing or attempting suicide, despite knowing that the victim previously thought about, considered, or tried to commit suicide; the crime would be punishable with up to five years in prison. .

State Senate

2010
Finegold ran for Massachusetts State Senate in 2010, seeking to represent the Second Essex and Middlesex district. The incumbent, Susan Tucker, was retiring. After winning the Democratic primary election, Finegold faced off against Republican Jamison Tomasek and Tea-Party-endorsed independent candidate Jodi Oberto for the seat. Finegold won the race with strong showings in Andover and Lawrence. He lost the towns of Dracut and Tewksbury by narrow margins.

2012

Finegold won reelection in 2012 against Republican Paul Adams, sweeping every precinct of all four communities .

2018

In March 2018, Finegold announced that he was running for the seat he previously held from 2011-2015. He won the three-way primary election by 47% defeating Michael Armano (32%) and Pavel Payano (20%) in the primary race and won the general election by a 2-to-1 ratio against Republican Joe Espinola, earning 63% of the vote to Espinola's 37%.

Awards
In 1999, Finegold won the Kennedy School Fenn Award for Political Leadership for his leadership in bringing together legislators and officials from New Hampshire and Massachusetts to address the traffic problems on I-93. His efforts led to the opening of the breakdown lane during rush hours, which greatly reduced congestion during peak commuting hours.

In 2003, Finegold was selected as one of the top young Democrats 100 to Watch by the Democratic Leadership Council.

The Massachusetts Alliance on Teen Pregnancy recognized Barry as Legislator of the Year for his efforts to save their programs from drastic budget cuts.

In 2014, Finegold was named a Clean Energy Champion by the New England Clean Energy Council. Clean Energy Champion Awards are presented to Legislators who have consistently taken the lead in advancing clean energy in the Commonwealth.

See also
 2019–2020 Massachusetts legislature
 2021–2022 Massachusetts legislature

References

External links
State Senator Barry Finegold
Barry Finegold Channel
Massachusetts House of Representatives
Public Blog

Living people
Democratic Party members of the Massachusetts House of Representatives
Democratic Party Massachusetts state senators
20th-century American Jews
People from Andover, Massachusetts
Franklin & Marshall College alumni
Harvard Kennedy School alumni
Massachusetts School of Law alumni
People from Norwood, Massachusetts
1971 births
21st-century American politicians
21st-century American Jews